Sperling is an unincorporated community in south central Manitoba, Canada. It is located on Provincial Trunk Highway 3 approximately 56 kilometers (36 miles) southwest of Winnipeg, Manitoba  in the Rural Municipality of Morris.

References 

Unincorporated communities in Pembina Valley Region